Celibacy syndrome (sekkusu shinai shōkōgun) is a media hypothesis proposing that a growing number of Japanese adults have lost interest in sexual activity and have also lost interest in romantic love, dating and marriage. Following a report in The Guardian, the theory gained widespread attention in English media outlets in 2013, and was subsequently refuted by several journalists and bloggers.

Reports and causes
In addition to celibacy, the theory cites declining numbers of marriages and declining birthrates in Japan.  According to surveys conducted by the Japan Association for Sex Education, between 2011 and 2013, the number of female college students reporting to be virgins increased.  Additionally, surveys conducted by the Japanese Family Planning Association (JFPA) indicated a high number of Japanese women who reported that they "were not interested in or despised sexual contact". Meanwhile, surveys conducted by the National Institute of Population and Social Security Research in Japan in 2008 and 2013, revealed that the number of Japanese men and women reporting to not be in any kind of romantic relationship grew by 10%.

The theory attributes two possible causes for these reports:  the past two decades of economic stagnation as well as high gender inequality in Japan.

Criticism
Joshua Keating accused The Guardian and other media outlets of using "cherry-picked" data in order to make a sensational claim that appeals to Western notions of a "weird Japan". The Washington Post pointed to contrary statistics that indicate that Japanese youth are having sex more frequently than ever.

See also
Aging of Japan
Herbivore men

References

Human sexuality
Sexology
Non-sexuality
Celibacy
Interpersonal relationships
Emotional issues
Shyness
Sexual attraction
Asexuality